Instrument of Government was the constitution of the Commonwealth of England.

Instrument of Government may also refer one of the Basic Laws of Sweden:
 Instrument of Government (1634) 
 Instrument of Government (1719)
 Instrument of Government (1720)
 Instrument of Government (1772)
 Instrument of Government (1809)
 Instrument of Government (1974)

The 1919 Constitution Act of Finland was also referred to as an "Instrument of Government" in Swedish.